The following table lists the largest mergers and acquisitions in the pharmaceutical and biotechnology industry (those over $10 billion). Transactions are recorded by the highest transaction dollar value (rather than using the inflation adjusted values).

Largest mergers and acquisitions
This list is incomplete, you can help by expanding it

Failed mergers and acquisitions

See also
List of largest mergers and acquisitions

References

Lists of pharmaceutical companies
Pharmaceutical